Henry Moore Baker (January 11, 1841 – May 30, 1912) was a lawyer and politician who served as a member of the New Hampshire House and Senate, and as a member of the United States House of Representatives representing New Hampshire.

Early life
Born in Bow, New Hampshire, near the capital city of Concord, Baker attended state common schools as well as Pembroke, Tilton, and Hopkinton Academies. He graduated from the New Hampshire Conference Seminary in 1859, Dartmouth College in 1863, and the law school of Columbian (now George Washington) University, Washington, D.C., in 1866.

Career
In 1866, Baker was admitted to the bar. From 1864 to 1874, he served as clerk in the War and Treasury Departments.

After leaving government service, Baker stayed in Washington, D.C., to practice law. From 1886 to 1887, he served as Judge Advocate General of the National Guard of New Hampshire with the rank of brigadier general.

In 1891 and 1892, Baker held a seat in the New Hampshire Senate until he was elected to be a Republican member of New Hampshire's delegation to the national House of Representatives representing New Hampshire's 2nd congressional district. He served in the Fifty-third and Fifty-fourth Congresses (March 3, 1893 – March 3, 1897).

After retiring from his Congressional seat, he once again practiced law in Washington, D.C., although he remained a legal resident of his hometown of Bow, New Hampshire. However, from 1905 to 1909, he was a member of the New Hampshire House of Representatives.

Death
He died in Washington, D.C., on May 30, 1912, and was buried in Alexander Cemetery in his hometown.

References

External links
 

1841 births
1912 deaths
Republican Party New Hampshire state senators
Dartmouth College alumni
Columbian College of Arts and Sciences alumni
United States Army generals
Republican Party members of the United States House of Representatives from New Hampshire
Republican Party members of the New Hampshire House of Representatives
19th-century American politicians
General Society of Colonial Wars
People from Bow, New Hampshire